"Welcome to My Hood" is the first single from American record producer DJ Khaled featuring American rappers Rick Ross, Plies, Lil Wayne, and T-Pain from the former's fifth studio album We the Best Forever. The album also contains the remix of the song featuring Ludacris, Busta Rhymes, Mavado, Twista, Birdman, Ace Hood, Fat Joe, The Game, Jadakiss, Bun B, and Waka Flocka Flame. The song is Khaled's first single to be produced with  The Renegades & DJ Nasty and LVM. It was released for digital download in the United States on January 18, 2011.

Featured artist T-Pain has referred to the song as successor to Khaled's 2007 song "I'm So Hood", which featured a similar hook, and verses from Ross, Plies, and Trick Daddy.

Music video
Gil Green directed the music video, which includes cameos from Flo Rida, Bow Wow, Busta Rhymes, Wale, Meek Mill, Ace Hood, Jae Millz, Marley G, Brisco, Mack Maine, Birdman and many more. The video shows T-Pain and Rick Ross posted up in the projects, later joining the rest of the crew for a night shoot against graffiti-covered walls.

Remix

The official remix features Ludacris, T-Pain, Busta Rhymes, Twista, Mavado, Birdman, Ace Hood, Fat Joe, Game, Jadakiss, Bun B, and Waka Flocka Flame, released on March 14, 2011.

As with the remix for Khaled's previous song "All I Do Is Win", Khaled himself raps a verse on the "Welcome to My Hood" remix.

As with the official music video, a 'Behind the Scenes' video to "Welcome to My Hood" was released on April 1.

On April 27, the official music video was released for the remix. Game does not appear in the video, nor does his verse.

AllMusic stated that the remix is "an air horn-fueled Miami anthem with Khaled taking a rare producer's credit".

Charts

Weekly charts

Year-end charts

Release history

References

2011 singles
DJ Khaled songs
T-Pain songs
Rick Ross songs
Plies (rapper) songs
Lil Wayne songs
Songs written by Plies (rapper)
Songs written by T-Pain
Songs written by Lil Wayne
Ludacris songs
Busta Rhymes songs
Twista songs
Birdman (rapper) songs
Ace Hood songs
Fat Joe songs
The Game (rapper) songs
Jadakiss songs
Bun B songs
Waka Flocka Flame songs
Cash Money Records singles
Music videos directed by Gil Green
Songs written by Rick Ross
Gangsta rap songs